Dean Orr is a New Zealand former rugby league footballer who represented New Zealand.

Playing career
Orr grew up in Te Atatū Peninsula, attended Matipo Primary School and played for the Te Atatu Roosters in the Auckland Rugby League competition.

In 1983 he represented the New Zealand national rugby league team, playing in one test match against Papua New Guinea. He is Kiwi number 585.

References

Living people
New Zealand rugby league players
New Zealand national rugby league team players
Auckland rugby league team players
Te Atatu Roosters players
Year of birth missing (living people)
Rugby league wingers